The Ceuta border fence forms part of the Morocco–Spain border at Ceuta, a city on the North African coast. Constructed by Spain, its purpose is to prevent smuggling and to stop migrants from entering Europe. Morocco objected to the construction of the barrier since it does not recognize Spanish sovereignty in Ceuta. 

Ceuta is an integral part of Spain, and therefore of the European Union; its border and its equivalent in Melilla are the only two land borders between the European Union and an African country.

The fence consists of parallel 6 metre (20-foot) high fences topped with barbed wire, with regular watchposts and a road running between them to accommodate police patrols or ambulance service in case of need. Underground cables connect spotlights, noise and movement sensors, and video cameras to a central control booth; dozens of guard ships and patrol boats check the coast, while 621 Guardia Civil officers and 548 police officers control the shore.

History

Breaches

2005 attempted border breach
On 7 October 2005, the border fence was assaulted by hundreds of migrants, attracting international attention. Caught between Spanish rubber bullets and Moroccan gunfire, a number of migrants died (sources put the number of deaths between 13 and 18 people) and more than 50 were wounded. Some of the dead were wounded by live ammunition; of those, two died on the Spanish side of the fence, apparently shot from the Moroccan positions. The 2005 events at the Ceuta and Melilla border fences are the subject of a documentary film, Victimes de nos richesses.

Since then, migrants have occasionally died while trying to break through the fence.

2016 breach
The fence was breached by an organised group of 400 illegal entrants in December 2016.

2017 breach
On 17 February 2017, an estimated 600 migrants, some armed with clubs and shears, broke through the security gates, and 300 of them are reported to have entered Ceuta, where police attempted to locate them.

2018 breaches 

 In June 2018, 400 migrants, the majority of whom were Moroccans, stormed the fence in Ceuta.
 In July 2018, 602 migrants forced their way across the border using shears, sticks and edged weapons. The migrants sprayed corrosive substances, excrement and urine on police officers, resulting in 22 Spanish police officers being wounded, four of whom suffered major burns. After this breach, the border was reinforced with more personnel, extra police vehicles and a helicopter equipped with night-vision equipment.
 In August 2018, of the hundreds who attempted to force their way into Ceuta, more than 100 people succeeded, bringing the overall total to 1,400. The migrants again threw excrement and corrosive substances at the Spanish police, wounding seven, some of whom suffered burns. The following day, 116 Africans were deported back across the border per a 1992 bilateral agreement between Spain and Morocco.

2019 breaches 
In August 2019, migrants stormed the fence using sticks and acid. Dozens were injured, 4 people died on the barbed wire and 11 border agents were wounded.

2021 breaches 
There were further breaches in May 2021, when migrants were filmed swimming or walking around the ends of the fence on the adjoining beaches at low tide.

See also
 Melilla border fence
 Moroccan Wall
 Spanish Armed Forces: General Command of Ceuta (COMGECEU)

References

Bibliography in English
 Ferrer-Gallardo, Xavier. 2008. "The Spanish-Moroccan Border Complex: Processes of Geopolitics, Functional and Symbolic Rebordering." Political Geography 27: 301–321.
 Gold, Peter. 2000. Europe or Africa: A Contemporary Study of the North African Enclaves of Ceuta and Melilla. Liverpool: Liverpool University Press.
 Moffette, David. 2013. "Muslim Ceutíes, Migrants and Porteadores: Race, Security and Tolerance at the Spanish-Moroccan Border." Canadian Journal of Sociology 38(4): 601–621.
 Valsecchi, Riccardo. 2009. "Ceuta, the border-fence of Europe"  WorldPress, 25 June 2009.

External links
 
 Spain: building border fence

 Ceuta, the border-fence of Europe
 Mustafa, the swimming fridge smuggler, and his macabre pact
 Attacking Europe's border fences
 Ceuta border fence photo gallery: 1  2 3 4 5 6 7 8  9

 Border barriers constructed during the European migrant crisis
Morocco–Spain border
Buildings and structures in Ceuta
Infrastructure completed in 1993